Río Blanco is a town and a municipality in the Matagalpa Department of Nicaragua.

References 

Municipalities of the Matagalpa Department